Spirit Man is a 1975 album by jazz keyboardist, Weldon Irvine.

Reception 
The Allmusic review by Jason Ankeny awarded the album 4 stars stating:
Spirit Man channels the sonic sprawl of the preceding Cosmic Vortex (Justice Divine) to forge a tighter, more focused approach. Eschewing vocals altogether, it's Weldon Irvine's most balanced and complete recording, deftly combining massive funk grooves with ingenious electronic elements. Featuring a supporting cast including bassist Cleveland Freeman, trumpeters Charles Sullivan and Everett "Blood" Hollins, and saxophonist Sonny Fortune, Spirit Man parallels Herbie Hancock's groundbreaking fusion dates in both the imagination and ferocity of Irvine's keyboards as well as the extraterrestrial reach of its electronic effects. This music is deep, funky, and deeply funky.

Track listings
All songs written by Weldon Irvine.

"We Gettin' Down" 5:50
"Softly" 0:37
"Pogo Stick" 6:45
"Blast Off" 4:17
"Jungle Juice" 8:10
"Yasmin" 4:37
"The Power and the Glory" 5:44
"Softly" 1:26

Personnel
Weldon Irvine - Conductor, Piano, Electric Piano, Clavinet, Synthesizer
Cleveland Freeman - Electric Bass
Wesley "Gator" Watson - Drums
Henry Grate, Jr. - Guitar
Bud Johnson, Jr. - Congas, Bongos
Charles Sullivan, Everett "Blood" Hollins - Trumpet
Sonny Fortune - Alto Saxophone
Floyd Butler, Harry Elston - Background Vocals on "We Gettin' Down"
Acy Lehman - art direction
David B. Hecht - photography

Samples & Covers
A Tribe Called Quest sampled "We Gettin' Down" on their song, "Award Tour" on their album Midnight Marauders in 1993.

References

External links
 Weldon Irvine-Spirit Man at Discogs

1975 albums
RCA Records albums
Weldon Irvine albums
Albums conducted by Weldon Irvine
Albums arranged by Weldon Irvine